The Canadian Land Surface Scheme (CLASS) is a land surface parametrization scheme for use in large scale climate models. It is a state-of-the-art model, using physically based equations to simulate the energy and water balances of vegetation, snow and soil. CLASS is being developed in a research project led by D. Verseghy at the Canadian Atmospheric Environment Service.

See also 
 CCCma - CLASS is used in CGCM3.1

References

 D. L. Verseghy, "The Canadian Land Surface Scheme (CLASS): its history and future," Atmosphere-Ocean, vol. 38, no. 1, pp. 1-13, 2000. 
 D. L. Verseghy, "CLASS--A Canadian Land Surface Scheme for GCMS: I. Soil Model," International Journal of Climatology IJCLEU, vol. p 111-133, p. 44, 1991. 
 D. L. Verseghy, N. A. McFarlane, and M. Lazare, "CLASS-A Canadian land surface scheme for GCMS, II. Vegetation model and coupled runs," Int. J. Climatol., vol. 13, no. 4, pp. 347-370, 1993.

External links

 CLASS
 Land Surface Processes

Numerical climate and weather models
Hydrology models